David Byron Boston (born August 19, 1978) is an American former professional football player who was a wide receiver in the National Football League (NFL). He was selected by the Arizona Cardinals eighth overall in the 1999 NFL Draft. During David Boston's college years he played football at Ohio State. Boston also played for the San Diego Chargers, Miami Dolphins, and Tampa Bay Buccaneers. Boston became a Pro Bowl selection with the Cardinals in 2001. The final years of Boston's career and his immediate post-football life was plagued by several arrests and other legal issues.

Early years
Boston was born in Humble, Texas, and played youth football in the Humble Area Football League.

College career
After graduating from Humble High School in Humble, Texas, Boston became a three-year starter for the Ohio State Buckeyes (1996–98). He set several Ohio State receiving records during that time. His 191 pass receptions as a Buckeye was a record and is now the second most in school history (K.J. Hill, 2019). His 2,855 career receiving yards and 1,435 single-season receiving yards were school records until surpassed by Michael Jenkins in 2003 and Jaxon Smith-Njigba in 2021 respectively. With 34 career touchdown receptions (and one two-point conversion), Boston averaged 5.89 points per game. Additionally, he held the school touchdown reception record until Chris Olave surpassed it in 2021.

Boston's best-remembered moment remains his game-winning five-yard touchdown reception from quarterback Joe Germaine with 19 seconds remaining in the 1997 Rose Bowl.

College statistics

Source:

Professional career

Pre-Draft

Arizona Cardinals
Boston left Ohio State with a year of eligibility remaining, and was drafted with the eighth overall pick in the first round of the 1999 NFL Draft by the Arizona Cardinals. In 2001, Boston had 98 receptions for 1598 yards and eight touchdowns, starting in the Pro Bowl.

San Diego Chargers
Boston signed a seven-year, $47 million contract ($12 million guaranteed) with the San Diego Chargers in 2003. That season, he caught 70 passes for 880 yards and seven touchdowns, though head coach Marty Schottenheimer suspended him for a game after he cursed out strength coach Dave Redding. Despite his adequate on-field performance, Chargers GM A.J. Smith traded Boston to the Miami Dolphins for a sixth round draft choice, citing his moody personality and lackadaisical practice habits.

Miami Dolphins
Before the 2004 season, Boston tested positive for steroids and was ordered to serve a four-game suspension. The suspension became moot after he tore ligaments in his knee and was unable to play for the entire season. The Dolphins cut him at the end of the year, then proceeded to re-sign him for the veterans' minimum in 2005. He played in five games that year before tearing knee ligaments again.

Tampa Bay Buccaneers
In 2006, Boston signed with the Tampa Bay Buccaneers. He was released by the team on September 12, 2007 after being arrested for DUI.

Toronto Argonauts
After spending the 2007 season out of football, Boston signed with the Toronto Argonauts of the Canadian Football League on April 21, 2008. Boston reported to training camp but his medical report showed a stress fracture in his right foot and recommended surgery. He was placed on the suspended list, never practicing or playing in the pre-season. A second doctor's opinion, however, was that it was a two-year-old injury and cleared him to play in the regular season opener on June 27, 2008, when he recorded two receptions for a total of 16 yards. Following the game, however, Boston reported feeling too much pain and opted to follow the original doctor's suggestion of surgery requiring a 10 to 12 weeks rehabilitation period. He never played another down of pro football.

NFL statistics

Personal life
Boston's father, Byron, is an American football official in the NFL. He was not permitted to officiate regular season games in which David was playing. Byron worked as a line judge for one of his son's preseason games, between the Cardinals and the San Diego Chargers on August 14, 1999.

On March 27, 2000, David Boston and Na'il Diggs were traveling northbound in a Hummer on I-71 in Columbus, Ohio. A Ford Escort driven by Danielle Carfagna was traveling the wrong way on the interstate and collided with the Hummer. Boston and Diggs were injured, and Carfagna was killed in the accident. Boston suffered lingering nerve damage from the accident. Police were not able to determine why the woman was driving the wrong way.

On March 13, 2002, Boston was accused of driving under the influence of cocaine and marijuana after testing positive for those drugs. He was arrested at his home after two people called 911. He pleaded no contest to misdemeanors, suspended sentence.

On October 19, 2004, Boston was accused of punching an airline ticket agent who wouldn't let him board a plane at an airport in Burlington, Vermont. He pleaded no contest, was fined $500 and paid $211 in restitution.

On August 23, 2007, Boston was arrested in Pinellas Park, Florida and charged with DUI after a failed sobriety test was conducted. Boston was released on his own recognizance.
Boston's breath test resulted in a reading of 0.00 BAC. On September 10, 2007 it was released to the media that David Boston tested positive for GHB, a recreational drug with questionable ties to bodybuilding. After learning of the drug charges the Buccaneers quickly came to an injury settlement with Boston allowing him to be released. On September 12, 2007, Boston was officially released by Tampa Bay when they decided to sign Mark Jones.

On December 1, 2011, Boston was accused of beating a woman after a night of drinking in Boca Raton. Boston allegedly punched the woman twice in the head, leaving a gash requiring 10 stitches, according to a Boca Raton police report. Boston pleaded guilty to a charge of aggravated battery and received a six-month prison sentence. Judge Charles Burton said that he was extending leniency to Boston, turning down the prosecution's request for a term of four years, because of medical evidence that the defendant had incurred permanent brain injuries from the four concussions he sustained during his playing days.

References

External links

Players of American football from Texas
American football wide receivers
Ohio State Buckeyes football players
Arizona Cardinals players
San Diego Chargers players
Miami Dolphins players
Tampa Bay Buccaneers players
Toronto Argonauts players
National Conference Pro Bowl players
1978 births
Living people
People from Humble, Texas
American sportspeople in doping cases
Doping cases in American football
Sportspeople from Harris County, Texas